The Court of Imperial Entertainments, also known as the Court of the Imperial Banquets, was a central government agency in several imperial Chinese and Vietnamese dynasties. It was generally in charge of catering for the imperial household, central government officials, and imperial banquets honoring foreign envoys and other dignitaries. In China, the office was created during the Northern Qi dynasty (550–577) and continued until the Qing dynasty (1636–1912). In Vietnam, it was created by Lê Thánh Tông in 1466, and continued until the Nguyễn dynasty.

It was one of the Nine Courts and normally under the supervision of the Ministry of Rites.

References

550 establishments
Nine Courts
Government of the Song dynasty
Government of the Tang dynasty
Government of the Yuan dynasty
Government of the Sui dynasty
Government of the Ming dynasty
Government of the Qing dynasty
Government of the Liao dynasty
Government of the Jin dynasty (1115–1234)
Government of the Nguyễn dynasty 
1912 disestablishments